Damghan University, also written as The University of Damghan (Danushgah-e Dam'an), is a university in the city of Damghan in Semnan province of Iran. Its most popular programs are in the fields of Basic Science.

History 

The university was founded by dedicated citizens of Damghan under the leadership of late Professor Mohammad Masoud Mansouri. The school was named Rasool Akram in honor of the Islamic prophet, Mohammad.

Faculty of Basic Sciences opened its door to 35 students majoring in geology in September 1992, and education operations began. Later on Ali Naderi, an engineer, directed the faculty until 1996 when the third president, Dr. Abdolrahim Naveh Ebrahim steered the faculty to a higher plateau of University of Basic Sciences.

After few years, the fields of Applied Mathematics, Pure Mathematics, Chemistry, Physics, Biology, Computer Science and Engineering in Associate, B.Sc., M.Sc. and PhD courses launched. In June 2014, Dr. Abdolali Basiri was appointed as the fifth president of the university.

Schools 
 School of Engineering
 School of Mathematics and Computer Science
 School of Biology
 School of Chemistry
 School of Earth Sciences
 School of Physics
 School of Art

See also
Higher Education in Iran

References

External links
 Official website

Universities in Iran
Educational institutions established in 1988
Education in Semnan Province
1988 establishments in Iran
Buildings and structures in Semnan Province